Marijana Jevtić is a Bosnian football midfielder who plays for Rudar Škale in the Slovenia's 1. SŽNL. She previously played for Pomurje, with which she also played the European Cup, and ŽNK Slovenj Gradec. She has been a member of the Bosnian national team for over a decade.

References

1980 births
Living people
Women's association football midfielders
Expatriate women's footballers in Slovenia
Bosnia and Herzegovina expatriate women's footballers
Bosnia and Herzegovina women's international footballers
ŽNK Mura players
Bosnia and Herzegovina women's footballers